Kemal Alomerović (born 8 December 1980, in Skopje) is a Macedonian retired football midfielder. He also holds Bosnian-Herzegovinian citizenship.

Club career
He has previously played for Macedonian clubs FK Sileks, FK Bregalnica Kraun, FK Bashkimi, FK Milano Kumanovo, FK Sloga Jugomagnat and FK Metalurg Skopje, beside foreign spells with Bulgarian PFC Marek Dupnitsa and Hungarian Zalaegerszegi TE.

Honours
Shkedija 79
Macedonian First League (1): 2010–11

External sources
 Profile at Playerhistory. 
 

1980 births
Living people
Footballers from Skopje
Macedonian people of Bosnia and Herzegovina descent
Macedonian Muslims
Association football midfielders
Macedonian footballers
Bosnia and Herzegovina footballers
FK Sileks players
FK Bregalnica Štip players
PFC Marek Dupnitsa players
FK Bashkimi players
FK Milano Kumanovo players
Zalaegerszegi TE players
FK Sloga Jugomagnat players
KF Bylis Ballsh players
Zeyashwemye F.C. players
KF Shkëndija players
FC Dacia Chișinău players
FK Metalurg Skopje players
Akademija Pandev players
FK Pobeda players
FK Belasica players
Macedonian First Football League players
First Professional Football League (Bulgaria) players
Nemzeti Bajnokság I players
Myanmar National League players
Moldovan Super Liga players
Macedonian Second Football League players
Macedonian expatriate footballers
Expatriate footballers in Bulgaria
Macedonian expatriate sportspeople in Bulgaria
Expatriate footballers in Hungary
Macedonian expatriate sportspeople in Hungary
Expatriate footballers in Myanmar
Macedonian expatriate sportspeople in Myanmar
Expatriate footballers in Moldova
Macedonian expatriate sportspeople in Moldova